Dameon Porter (born May 21, 1975) is a former wide receiver/defensive back in the Arena Football League (AFL) and National Football League (NFL).

Early life and education
He played college football at Wayne State College in Wayne, Nebraska.

Career
He played for the Green Bay Packers 2001-2002, Iowa Barnstormers (1998–1999), the New Jersey Red Dogs (2000), the Chicago Rush (2001–2003), the Georgia Force (2004), the Austin Wranglers (2004), the Las Vegas Gladiators (2005–2006), the Grand Rapids Rampage (2006).

Porter led the Arena Football League in interceptions in back-to-back seasons from 2001 and 2002. Porter picked off 12 passes in 2001 and recorded 10 more in 2002. In Week 4 of the 2003 Arena Football League season, Porter made a clutch interception against the Los Angeles Avengers at the goal line to seal the Chicago Rush victory. The Rush entered the game 0-3 playing 3-0 Los Angeles, which gave Chicago its first win of the 2003 season while handing the Avengers their first defeat of the year.

Awards and honors
He was named First Team All-Arena in 2001 and 2002. Porter was also named the AFL Breakout Player of the Year and the Ironman of the Year in 2001.

References

External links
http://www.arenafan.com/players/?page=players&player=2099

1975 births
Living people
Sportspeople from Los Angeles County, California
American football wide receivers
American football defensive backs
Iowa Barnstormers players
New Jersey Red Dogs players
Chicago Rush players
Georgia Force players
Austin Wranglers players
Las Vegas Gladiators players
Grand Rapids Rampage players
Players of American football from California